Zachary Paul "Zach" Makovsky (born April 19, 1982) is an American mixed martial artist currently competing in the flyweight division of the Brave Combat Federation. He has competed in EliteXC, ShoXC, Bellator, and Ultimate Fighting Championship. He is the former Bellator Bantamweight World Champion.

Background
Makovsky was born in Bethlehem, Pennsylvania.  Makovsky began wrestling when he was six years old and excelled in youth and middle school programs before attending Bethlehem Catholic High School where he was a four-year varsity letterman and the captain for his senior season. Makovsky then attended Drexel University, and was a walk on for the wrestling team. After redshirting his first season, he went on to be a four-year varsity letterman and captain of the team for his senior season. During the off-season, Makovsky trained in mixed martial arts, met Eddie Alvarez, and competed in many grappling tournaments. Makovsky's overall grappling record is 65-7.

Mixed martial arts career

Early career
Makovsky began his mixed martial arts career in small shows based in New Jersey, United States. He compiled a 3–0 record, with each victory coming via decision (two via unanimous decision and one via split decision).

EliteXC
Makovsky then joined EliteXC and made his promotional debut at ShoXC: Elite Challenger Series in January 2008. His opponent was two-time Bellator Featherweight Tournament participant Wilson Reis. Early in the second round, Reis defeated Makovsky via submission (arm-triangle choke).

Makovsky returned in May 2008, at EliteXC: Primetime to face André Soares. After three rounds, Makovsky was declared the winner via unanimous decision.

EliteXC then dissolved and Makovsky fought two bouts in New Jersey, winning both via rear-naked choke submission.

Makovsky then fought his first fight abroad, in Tokyo, Japan, against Toshiaki Kitada. Makovsky was submitted with a rear-naked choke submission late in the first round.

In his final pre-Bellator fight, Makovsky was part of the M-1 Selection in the Americas. He defeated Josh Rave via technical submission (guillotine choke) after controlling the bout with effective takedowns and wrestling.

Bellator Fighting Championships
Makovsky debuted for the Bellator promotion at Bellator 21 against Eric Luke. Late in the second round, Makovsky forced Luke to tap out to a kimura. As a result of that victory, Makovsky was signed to take part in the Bellator Season Three Bantamweight Tournament.

At Bellator 27, Makovsky defeated Nick Mamalis via unanimous decision. The win moved Makovsky into the semi-final round.

There, Makovsky faced Bryan Goldsby. Makovsky used his wrestling and jiu-jitsu to frustrate Goldsby and claimed a unanimous decision victory.

In the tournament final, Makovsky faced Ed West. Makovsky also fell to a kimura early in the matchup and a knee that knocked him down in the opening seconds. However, Makovsky came back and controlled the fight to take a unanimous decision and become the inaugural Bellator Bantamweight Champion.

Makovsky next faced undefeated Chad Robichaux at Bellator 41 in a non-title fight.  He won the fight via TKO in the third round.

Makovsky fought in his second non-title fight at Bellator 54. He faced one-time UFC competitor Ryan Roberts and won via submission in the first round.

Makovsky attempted to make his first title defense against Season 5 bantamweight tournament winner Eduardo Dantas at Bellator 65 in Atlantic City on April 13, 2012. He lost via second round technical submission due to an arm triangle choke.

Makovsky attempted to get back into the win column when he took on Anthony Leone, but lost the fight by controversial split decision. After two consecutive losses, Makovsky was released from the promotion.

Cage Fury
On May 11, 2013 Makovsky made his flyweight debut for Cage Fury Fighting Championships. Makovsky defeated fellow Bellator veteran Claudio Ledesma via unanimous decision.

Resurrection Fighting Alliance
On November 22, 2013 Makovsky made his debut for RFA against Matt Manzanares for the vacant Flyweight Championship. He won the fight via unanimous decision.

Ultimate Fighting Championship
On December 4, 2013, it was announced that Makovsky had signed with the Ultimate Fighting Championship, stepping in to replace an injured John Dodson against Scott Jorgensen at UFC on Fox 9.  He won the fight via unanimous decision.

For his second UFC fight, Makovsky made a quick return to the Octagon as he faced Josh Sampo at UFC 170 on February 22, 2014. He won the fight via unanimous decision.

Makovsky was expected to face Jussier Formiga on August 2, 2014 at UFC 176.  However, after UFC 176 was cancelled, Formiga/Makovsky was rescheduled and eventually took place on August 16, 2014 at UFC Fight Night 47. Makovsky lost the fight via unanimous decision.

Makovsky faced Tim Elliott on February 15, 2014 at UFC Fight Night 60. Makovsky won the back-and-forth fight by unanimous decision.

Makovsky faced John Dodson on May 23, 2015 at UFC 187.  Makovsky lost the fight via unanimous decision.

Makovsky faced Joseph Benavidez on February 6, 2016 at UFC Fight Night 82. He lost the fight via unanimous decision.

Makovsky was expected to face John Moraga on December 10, 2016 at UFC 206. However, Moraga pulled out of the fight in early November citing injury and was replaced by Dustin Ortiz. He lost the fight via split decision.

Absolute Championship Berkut

Makovsky faced Josiel Silva at ACB 60 on 13 May 2017. He won via submission in the third round.

Makovsky faced Yoni Sherbatov at ACB 72 on October 14, 2017. He lost the fight via unanimous decision.

Brave Combat Federation
Makovsky debuted for the promotion at Brave CF 34. His opponent was 2016 sambo world champion, Russian fighter Velimurad Alkhasov. Makovsky won the contest via split decision.

Makovsky was expected to face Abdul Hussein in the opening round of the Brave Flyweight Championship tournament. However, Hussein was forced to withdraw from the bout due to sickness during the weight cut. Makovsky advanced to the semifinals of the tournament.

Makovsky rematched Velimurad Alkhasov in the semi-final of the Brave Flyweight Championship tournament  on April 1, 2021 at Brave CF 50. In a very close bout, Makovsky lost via split decision.

Championships
 Bellator Fighting Championships
 Bellator Bantamweight World Championship (One time, First)
 Bellator Season 3 Bantamweight Tournament Winner
 Resurrection Fighting Alliance
 RFA Flyweight Championship (One time, Current)
 Combat in the Cage
 CITC Bantamweight Championship (One time)

Mixed martial arts record

|-
|Loss
|align=center|21–11
|Asu Almabaev
|Decision (split)
|Brave CF 60
|
|align=center|3
|align=center|5:00
|Isa Town, Bahrain
|
|-
|Loss
| align=center| 21–10
|Velimurad Alkhasov
|Decision (split)
|Brave CF 50
|
|align=center|3
|align=center|5:00
|Arad, Bahrain
|
|-
|Win
| align=center| 21–9
| Velimurad Alkhasov
| Decision (split)
| Brave CF 34
| 
| align=center| 3
| align=center| 5:00
| Ljubljana, Slovenia
|
|-
|Loss
| align=center| 20–9
| Yoni Sherbatov
| Decision (unanimous)
| ACB 72
| 
| align=center| 3
| align=center| 5:00
| Montreal, Quebec, Canada
|
|-
| Win
| align=center| 20–8
| Josiel Silva
| Submission (guillotine choke)
| ACB 60
| 
| align=center| 3
| align=center| 1:08
| Vienna, Austria
|
|-
|Loss
| align=center| 19–8
| Dustin Ortiz
| Decision (split)
| UFC 206
| 
| align=center|3
| align=center|5:00
| Toronto, Ontario, Canada
|
|-
| Loss
| align=center | 19–7
| Joseph Benavidez
| Decision (unanimous)
| UFC Fight Night: Hendricks vs. Thompson
| 
| align=center | 3
| align=center | 5:00
| Las Vegas, Nevada, United States
|
|-
| Loss
| align=center | 19–6
| John Dodson
| Decision (unanimous)
| UFC 187
| 
| align=center | 3
| align=center | 5:00
| Las Vegas, Nevada United States
|
|-
| Win
| align=center | 19–5
| Tim Elliott
| Decision (unanimous)
| UFC Fight Night: Henderson vs. Thatch
| 
| align=center | 3
| align=center | 5:00
| Broomfield, Colorado, United States
|
|-
| Loss
| align=center | 18–5
| Jussier Formiga
| Decision (unanimous)
| UFC Fight Night: Bader vs. St. Preux
| 
| align=center | 3
| align=center | 5:00
| Bangor, Maine, United States
|
|-
| Win
| align=center | 18–4
| Josh Sampo
| Decision (unanimous)
| UFC 170
| 
| align=center | 3
| align=center | 5:00
| Las Vegas, Nevada, United States
|
|-
| Win
| align=center | 17–4
| Scott Jorgensen
| Decision (unanimous)
| UFC on Fox: Johnson vs. Benavidez 2
| 
| align=center | 3
| align=center | 5:00
| Sacramento, California, United States
|
|-
| Win
| align=center | 16–4
| Matt Manzanares
| Decision (unanimous)
| RFA 11
| 
| align=center | 5
| align=center | 5:00
| Broomfield, Colorado, United States
| 
|-
| Win
| align=center | 15–4
| Claudio Ledesma
| Decision (unanimous)
| CFFC 24
| 
| align=center | 3
| align=center | 5:00
| Atlantic City, New Jersey, United States
| 
|-
| Loss
| align=center | 14–4
| Anthony Leone
| Decision (split)
| Bellator 83
| 
| align=center | 3
| align=center | 5:00
| Atlantic City, New Jersey, United States
|
|-
| Loss
| align=center | 14–3
| Eduardo Dantas
| Submission (arm-triangle choke)
| Bellator 65
| 
| align=center | 2
| align=center | 3:26
| Atlantic City, New Jersey, United States
| 
|-
|  Win
| align=center | 14–2
| Ryan Roberts
| Submission (north-south choke)
| Bellator 54
| 
| align=center | 1
| align=center | 4:48
| Atlantic City, New Jersey, United States
| 
|-
|  Win
| align=center | 13–2
| Chad Robichaux
| TKO (punches)
| Bellator 41
| 
| align=center | 3
| align=center | 2:02
| Yuma, Arizona, United States
| 
|-
|  Win
| align=center | 12–2
| Ed West
| Decision (unanimous)
| Bellator 32
| 
| align=center | 5
| align=center | 5:00
| Kansas City, Missouri, United States
| 
|-
|  Win
| align=center | 11–2
| Bryan Goldsby
| Decision (unanimous)
| Bellator 30
| 
| align=center | 3
| align=center | 5:00
| Louisville, Kentucky, United States
| 
|-
|  Win
| align=center | 10–2
| Nick Mamalis
| Decision (unanimous)
| Bellator 27
| 
| align=center | 3
| align=center | 5:00
| San Antonio, Texas, United States
| 
|-
| Win
| align=center | 9–2
| Eric Luke
| Submission (kimura)
| Bellator 21
| 
| align=center | 2
| align=center | 4:28
| Hollywood, Florida, United States
|
|-
| Win
| align=center | 8–2
| Josh Rave
| Submission (guillotine choke)
| M-1 Selection 2010: The Americas Round 1
| 
| align=center | 3
| align=center | 1:49
| Atlantic City, New Jersey, United States
|
|-
| Win
| align=center | 7–2
| David Harris
| Submission (triangle choke)
| Adrenaline: New Breed
| 
| align=center | 1
| align=center | 1:50
| Atlantic City, New Jersey, United States
|
|-
| Loss
| align=center | 6–2
| Toshiaki Kitada
| Submission (rear-naked choke)
| Deep: 43 Impact
| 
| align=center | 1
| align=center | 4:22
| Tokyo, Japan
|
|-
| Win
| align=center | 6–1
| Nate Williams
| Submission (rear-naked choke)
| WCA: Caged Combat
| 
| align=center | 3
| align=center | 2:33
| Atlantic City, New Jersey, United States
|
|-
| Win
| align=center | 5–1
| Justin Robbins
| Submission (rear-naked choke)
| Extreme Challenge: The War at the Shore
| 
| align=center | 2
| align=center | 1:05
| Atlantic City, New Jersey, United States
|
|-
| Win
| align=center | 4–1
| André Soares
| Decision (unanimous)
| EliteXC: Primetime
| 
| align=center | 3
| align=center | 5:00
| Newark, New Jersey, United States
|
|-
| Loss
| align=center | 3–1
| Wilson Reis
| Submission (arm-triangle choke)
| ShoXC: Elite Challenger Series
| 
| align=center | 2
| align=center | 1:15
| Atlantic City, New Jersey, United States
|
|-
| Win
| align=center | 3–0
| Emerson Souza
| Decision (unanimous)
| CITC: Fearless Fighters Return
| 
| align=center | 3
| align=center | 5:00
| Trenton, New Jersey, United States
| 
|-
| Win
| align=center | 2–0
| Leandro Escobar
| Decision (split)
| Extreme Challenge 75
| 
| align=center | 3
| align=center | 5:00
| Trenton, New Jersey, United States
|
|-
| Win
| align=center | 1–0
| Tinh Tupy
| Decision (unanimous)
| CITC: Evolutions
| 
| align=center | 3
| align=center | 5:00
| Asbury Park, New Jersey, United States
|

See also
 List of current Brave CF fighters
 List of Bellator MMA alumni
 List of male mixed martial artists

References

External links
 
 
 

1982 births
Living people
American male mixed martial artists
Bantamweight mixed martial artists
Flyweight mixed martial artists
Mixed martial artists utilizing collegiate wrestling
Mixed martial artists utilizing Brazilian jiu-jitsu
Bellator MMA champions
Bellator male fighters
Ultimate Fighting Championship male fighters
Mixed martial artists from Pennsylvania
American male sport wrestlers
Amateur wrestlers
American practitioners of Brazilian jiu-jitsu
Sportspeople from Atlanta
Sportspeople from Northampton County, Pennsylvania
Bethlehem Catholic High School alumni